Direct insolation is the insolation measured at a given location on Earth with a surface element perpendicular to the Sun's rays, excluding diffuse insolation (the solar radiation that is scattered or reflected by atmospheric components in the sky). Direct insolation is equal to the solar irradiance above the atmosphere minus the atmospheric losses due to absorption and scattering. While the solar irradiance above the atmosphere varies with the Earth–Sun distance and solar cycles, the losses depend on the time of day (length of light's path through the atmosphere depending on the solar elevation angle), cloud cover, humidity, and other impurities.

Simplified formula
A simple formula gives the approximate level of direct insolation when there are no clouds:

where AM is the airmass given by

with θ being the zenith angle (90° minus the altitude) of the sun.

For the sun at the zenith, this gives 947 W/m2. However, another source states that direct sunlight under these conditions, with 1367 W/m2 above the atmosphere, is about 1050 W/m2, and total insolation about 1120 W/m2.

Average direct insolation
For practical purposes, a time-average of the direct insolation over the course of the year is commonly used. This averaging takes into account the absence of sunlight during the night, increased scatter in the morning and evening hours, average effects of cloud cover and smog, as well as seasonal variations of the mid-day solar elevation.

Units of measurement
Direct insolation is measured in (W/m2) or kilowatt-hours per square meter per day (kW·h/(m2·day)). 
 1 kW·h/(m2·day) = 1,000 W · 1 hour / ( 1 m2 · 24 hours) = 41.67 W/m2
In the case of photovoltaics, average direct insolation is commonly measured in terms of peak direct insolation as kWh/(kWp·y)
(kilowatt hours per year per kilowatt peak rating)

Applications
Since radiation directly from the sun can be focussed with mirrors and lens, it can be applied to concentrated solar thermal (CST) systems. Due to clouds and aerosols, the direct insolation can fluctuate throughout the day, so forecasting the available resource is important in these applications

References

External links
 National Science Digital Library - Direct Insolation

Atmospheric radiation
Visibility